Aang Suparman (born 21 September 1984) is an Indonesian former footballer who plays as a centre-back.

Career
He joined Persib in 2012. On 4 June 2014, he joined Gresik United F.C. until the end of 2014.

Honours

Club
Persibo Bojonegoro
 Piala Indonesia (1): 2012

References

External links
 

1984 births
Living people
Indonesian footballers
Persib Bandung players
Gresik United players
Association football defenders
Persela Lamongan players
Borneo F.C. players
Persibo Bojonegoro players
Persiba Balikpapan players
Persikab Bandung players
People from Garut